Vašica is a village in Serbia. It is situated in the Šid municipality, in the Syrmia District, Vojvodina province. The village has a Serb ethnic majority and its population numbering 1,717 people (2002 census).

Demographics 

Population of Vašica according to the official censuses:
1948: 2,065
1953: 2,158
1961: 2,163
1971: 1,963
1981: 1,740
1991: 1,632
2002: 1,717

Ethnic groups (2002 census)  

Serbs = 1,480 (86,19%)
Croats = 124 (7.22%)
Yugoslavs = 40 (2.32%)
Slovaks = 24 (1.39%)
Rusyns = 13 (0.75%)
others

See also
List of places in Serbia
List of cities, towns and villages in Vojvodina

References 

Populated places in Syrmia